Oluwabukola Sekinat Ajoke Wright (born 31 March 1967), professional known as Bukky Wright  is a Nigerian actress, businesswoman and politician. She runs the fashion house B Collections and the beauty spa B Wright.

Biography
Bukky was born to a Christian father and a Muslim mother in Abeokuta. She attended the University of Lagos, and earned a bachelor's degree in economics.

Bukky began her acting career in 1996. She has featured in several Nollywood movies of Yoruba and English languages, including Wale Adenuga's Television series Super story.

In 2014, Bukky Wright contested for the post of a Honourable in Ogun State House of Assembly  under the platform of the Social Democratic Party (SDP) led by former Governor Olusegun Osoba.

Personal life
Bukky Wright is married, and she has two sons, Eniola and Gbenga. She became a grandmother when one of her sons had a child.

Politics

In 2014, through the Social Democratic Party, she ran for the position of Senator in Ogun State House of Representatives.

Selected filmography
Saworo ide (1999)
Above Love (2004)
Abeni (2006)
Outkast (2011)
Kodun Kopo Kope (KKK)
Gidi Blues
Omotara Johnson
Unforgivable
Afefe Alaafia
Dugbe Dugbe
 Nkem Temi
 Ago Meje 
Oko Nnene
Habitat
Red Hot (2013)
Iyore (2014)
When Love Happens (2014)
Special Jollof (2020)

See also
List of Yoruba people

References

External links

Living people
1967 births
Actresses from Abeokuta
University of Lagos alumni
Yoruba actresses
Yoruba women in business
Nigerian film actresses
Nigerian television actresses
20th-century Nigerian actresses
21st-century Nigerian actresses
Actresses in Yoruba cinema
Nigerian fashion businesspeople
Nigerian actor-politicians
Nigerian women in politics
21st-century Nigerian businesswomen
21st-century Nigerian businesspeople
Businesspeople from Abeokuta
Yoruba women in politics
Social Democratic Party (Nigeria) politicians
Politicians from Abeokuta